Warnakulasuriya Antony Nimal Lanza commonly known as Nimal Lanza and Kudu Lanza (born 13 October 1974) is a Sri Lankan politician, a member of the Sri Lanka Podujana Peramuna,  Sri Lanka Freedom Party - United People's Freedom Alliance/ United People's Freedom Alliance, from the Gampaha district

Nimal Lanza is the son of Pilendran and Rani Lanza. He has three siblings, Dayan (the current Mayor of Negombo), Sadana and Shakila. 

He received his education at St. Maris College, Negombo. 

In 1993 Lanza contested the Negombo Municipal Council elections coming second on the preferential list and when Ananda Munasinghe, the former mayor, became an MP in 2000, he was appointed in his place. In 2001 he was opposition leader and was made a minister on the Council. In 2014 he was re-elected and continue to perform as a Provincial Council Minister.

He was elected to parliament representing the Gampaha District at the 2015 parliamentary elections. On 9 September 2015 he was appointed the Deputy Minister of Home Affairs in the Second Sirisena cabinet but resigned from the role on 19 December 2017. After the victory of Gotabhaya Rajapaksa in the 2019 presidential election, he served as the State Minister of Community Development.

Lanza married Enoka and they have two sons.

References

Living people
Members of the 15th Parliament of Sri Lanka
Members of the 16th Parliament of Sri Lanka
Sri Lanka Podujana Peramuna politicians
1974 births
Sri Lankan Roman Catholics